Anna Aizer is a labor and health economist, who currently serves as the Maurice R. Greenberg Professor of Economics at Brown University where she is also a Faculty Associate at the Population Studies and Training Center. Her research focuses on child health and well-being, in particular the effect of societal factors and social issues on children's health.

Biography 
Aizer received her Bachelor of Arts degree from Amherst College in Amherst, Massachusetts, in 1991, a Master of Science at Harvard University in 1995, and a PhD at the University of California, Los Angeles in 2002. She then went on to a postdoctoral fellowship at Princeton University's Center for Research on Child Bearing, before becoming a professor and the chair of the economic department at Brown University where she currently works. She is also a co-director of the NBER's program on children.

Research 
As a labor and health economist, Aizer has an interest in child health and well-being. Her scholarly interests are child health, child support, domestic violence, Medicaid, poverty and welfare, and her recent focus is on the inter-generational transmission of health and income.

Inter-generational transmission of poverty 
Together with economist Janet Currie, Aizer published a paper in Science as a co-author, arguing that inequality of outcomes could be passed on through maternal disadvantage. Descending from the bad parental health, maternal disadvantage leads to the poor health of the children at birth. This also leads to less access in medical care, further worsening the health of children. Yet, the health of the newborn children is improving among the most disadvantaged population, likely due to the improvement in public policies and the increase in the knowledge of infant health.

With Shari Eli, Joseph Ferrie and Adriana Lleras-Muney, Aizer also estimated the long-term impact of cash transfers to poor families from the records of applicants to the Mother's Pension program and death records. From this the authors found that the male children of the accepted applicants lived longer, got more years of schooling, were less likely to be underweight and had higher income than that of the rejected mothers.

Cooperating with Laura Stroud and Stephen Buka, Aizer studied the effect of maternal stress the offspring outcomes. They found that the exposure to high levels of stress hormone negatively affects the offspring's cognition, health and educational attainment. By establishing the relationship between the cortisol level and the development of human capital, the study also reveals the impact of elevated cortisol on the offspring, making a link with the topic of inter-generational persistence of poverty.

Child health and well-being 
A major topic of Aizer's work has been access for children to social services. Aizer has found that barriers public health insurance enrollment include the information and the administrative costs. These barriers differ based on race.

Aizer also published an article focusing on adult supervision and child behavior, examining the issue of children spending their school years without adult supervision due to the growth in the number of women entering the workforce and the high cost of child care.

In 2015, Aizer published an article on juvenile incarceration in the Quarterly Journal of Economics with Joseph J. Doyle, Jr. In this study, they estimate the effects of juvenile incarceration on the completion of high school and adult recidivism by analyzing the incarceration tendency of randomly assigned judges. Together, they found incarceration of juveniles significantly reduces rates of returning to school while increasing the frequency of juveniles classified as emotionally or behaviorally disordered when juveniles do return to school.

Selected works 

 Aizer, Anna (2010/09). "The Gender Wage Gap and Domestic Violence". American Economic Review. 100 (4): 1847–1859. DOI: 10.1257/aer.100.4.1847
 Anna Aizer, Joseph J. Doyle, Juvenile Incarceration, Human Capital, and Future Crime: Evidence from Randomly Assigned Judges, The Quarterly Journal of Economics, Volume 130, Issue 2, May 2015, Pages 759–803 
 Anna Aizer, Janet Currie. Networks or neighborhoods Correlations in the use of publicly-funded maternity care in California. Journal of Public Economics, Volume 88, Issue 12, December 2004, Pages 2573–2585.
 Aizer, Anna (2007-07-12). "Public Health Insurance, Program Take-Up, and Child Health". The Review of Economics and Statistics. 89 (3): 400–415. 
 Aizer, Anna. Home alone: supervision after school and child behavior. Journal of Public Economics. Volume 88, Issues 9–10, August 2004, Pages 1835–1848. 
 Currie, Janet; Aizer, Anna (2014-05-23). "The intergenerational transmission of inequality: Maternal disadvantage and health at birth". Science. 344 (6186): 856–861.DOI: 10.1126/science.1251872
 Aizer, Anna; Cunha, Flávio (2012-9). "The Production of Human Capital: Endowments, Investments and Fertility".DOI: 10.3386/w18429
 Lleras-Muney, Adriana; Ferrie, Joseph; Eli, Shari; Aizer, Anna (2016/04). "The Long-Run Impact of Cash Transfers to Poor Families". American Economic Review. 106 (4): 935–971.DOI: 10.1257/aer.20140529
 Aizer, Anna (2011-07-01). "Poverty, Violence, and Health The Impact of Domestic Violence During Pregnancy on Newborn Health". Journal of Human Resources. 46 (3): 518–538.doi: 10.3368/jhr.46.3.518
 Aizer, Anna. 2003. "Low Take-Up in Medicaid: Does Outreach Matter and for Whom? ." American Economic Review, 93 (2): 238–241.DOI: 10.1257/000282803321947119
 Buka, Stephen; Stroud, Laura; Aizer, Anna (2016-08-01). "Maternal Stress and Child Outcomes: Evidence from Siblings". Journal of Human Resources. 51 (3): 523–555. doi: 10.3368/jhr.51.3.0914-6664R
 Aizer, Anna (2008-9). "Peer Effects and Human Capital Accumulation: the Externalities of ADD". doi:10.3386/w14354
 DOI: 10.3386/w9907
 McLanahan, Sara; Aizer, Anna (2006-01-01). "The Impact of Child Support Enforcement on Fertility, Parental Investments, and Child Well-Being". Journal of Human Resources. XLI (1): 28–45. doi: 10.3368/jhr.XLI.1.28
 Aizer, Anna; Currie, Janet; Moretti, Enrico (2007-07-12). "Does Managed Care Hurt Health? Evidence from Medicaid Mothers". The Review of Economics and Statistics. 89 (3): 385–399.

References

External links 
 

Living people
Year of birth missing (living people)
American women academics
21st-century American economists
Brown University faculty
Harvard School of Public Health alumni
Amherst College alumni
21st-century American women educators
21st-century American educators